The Amos Hulme Barn in Paris, Idaho was listed on the National Register of Historic Places in 1982.

It was deemed to be "one of the best preserved of Paris's modest log barns".

References

Barns on the National Register of Historic Places in Idaho
Buildings and structures completed in 1880
Bear Lake County, Idaho
Log buildings and structures on the National Register of Historic Places in Idaho